Zheng Bin (born July 4, 1977) is a Chinese football coach and a former international who played as a left midfielder or striker.

As a player he represented Shenzhen Jianlibao, Wuhan Huanghelou and Wuhan Zall while internationally he played for the Chinese national team that participated in the 2004 AFC Asian Cup. Since retiring he moved into management, and gained his first head coaching position with Wuhan Zall.

Club career

Early career
As with all the most promising young Chinese players Zheng Bin would quickly be included in the short-lived Chinese national youth team program to study football abroad in a training programme sponsored by Jianlibao and called the Chinese Jianlibao Youth Football Team. After graduating through the Jianlibao Youth Team he would return to his hometown to play for Wuhan Hongjinlong to start his professional football career. In his debut season he would play six games in his debut season. He would then go on to play in the majority of Wuhan's games throughout the 1999 league season that saw the team relegated.

Shenzhen Jianlibao
The following seasons would see him remain with Wuhan in their attempts to return to the top tier until Shenzhen Jianlibao's Head coach Zhu Guanghu showed an interest within him. Zheng Bin would eventually join Shenzhen Jianlibao at the beginning of the 2003 league season. The move would immediately become very successful for him when he quickly established himself within the team in his debut season and then in his second season help the team to win the 2004 Chinese Super League title.

Return to Wuhan
Despite just winning the league title with Shenzhen Jianlibao the club had many financial difficulties and when his previous club just having won promotion and offering 3,500,000 RMB for the return of his services Zheng Bin would immediately rejoin them. Once again this turned out to be a successful transfer for him when he once again settled straight away within the team and this time go on to win the 2005 Chinese Super League Cup. He would soon go on to captain the team until the club controversially disbanded for what they believed was unfair punishment by the Chinese Football Association after the club's management did not accept the punishment given to them by the Chinese Football Association after a scuffle broke out during a league game against Beijing Guoan on September 27, 2008.

Return to Shenzhen
Without a club Zheng Bin would return to Shenzhen Jianlibao (who had renamed themselves Shenzhen Shangqingyin) at the beginning of the 2009 league season. While he was not an immediate first choice player at the start of the season, once he was given his chance to play he would quickly show his experience within the team and would quickly become a regular within the team.

Join Hubei Oriental
At 2010 season, the new Wuhan club Hubei Oriental had successfully promotion to China League One. Zheng returned to Wuhan again and joined the team to play the new season.

International career
Zheng Bin would be included in the Chinese squad and go on to make his debut in a friendly against Costa Rica on September 7, 2003 in a 2-0 defeat. Despite the result he would go on to become a regular within the team and his versatility within midfield would see him go on to be included in the squad that went to the 2004 AFC Asian Cup that came runners-up. He would go on to play in several FIFA World Cup qualifiers and the 2007 AFC Asian Cup, however once the tournament ended he would lose favour within the team.

Honours
Shenzhen Jianlibao
Chinese Super League: 2004

Wuhan Huanghelou
Chinese Super League Cup: 2005

References

External links
Player stats at Football-lineups.com

Player stats at Sohu.com

1977 births
Living people
Footballers from Wuhan
Association football forwards
Association football midfielders
Chinese footballers
China international footballers
Wuhan Guanggu players
Shenzhen F.C. players
Wuhan F.C. players
Chinese Super League players
China League One players
2004 AFC Asian Cup players
2007 AFC Asian Cup players
Wuhan F.C. managers
Chinese football managers